Țețchea is a commune in Bihor County, Crișana, Romania with a population of 3,141 people. It is composed of four villages: Hotar (Izsópallaga), Subpiatră (Kőalja), Telechiu (Mezőtelki) and Țețchea.

References

Communes in Bihor County
Localities in Crișana